There are approximately thirteen nationally recognized public holidays in Ghana, a sub-Saharan country in Africa. The primary National holiday is Independence Day which is on the 6th of March. It is a National Day and is set to honor the memory of  Ghana's independence from the United Kingdom in 1957.

This is a list of public holidays in Ghana.

National holidays

Notes 
 Introduced by the Ministry of Food and Agriculture, National Farmers' Day was organized as a day’s activity for the nation to honor its hard working farmers, with certificates and prizes, who excelled in their contributions to improve the agricultural sector.  In 1988, the first Friday of every December was designated by the government as Farmers' Day and is celebrated as a statutory Public Holiday.
 With the exception of Farmers' Day which is always on a Friday, when these dates fall at the weekend, the following Monday tends to be declared a holiday.
 Kwame Nkrumah Memorial Day  is celebrated in commemoration of the birthday of Dr. Kwame Nkrumah, the first President of Ghana.
 The Constitution Day is a newly designated Public Holiday, which will be observed starting on 7 January 2019.

It is not mandatory that all Ghanaian institutions/organizations recognize public holidays. Institutions/organizations that are exempt include; The Ghana National Fire Service, food vendors, some category of hotels, health service providers such as hospitals, dealers in pharmaceutical products etc.

References 

 
Ghanaian culture
Ghana
Hollidays